Roger Mark Boisjoly (April 25, 1938 – January 6, 2012) was an American mechanical engineer, fluid dynamicist, and an aerodynamicist. He is best known for having raised strenuous objections to the launch of the Space Shuttle Challenger months before the loss of the spacecraft and its crew in January 1986. Boisjoly correctly predicted, based on earlier flight data, that the O-rings on the rocket boosters would fail if the shuttle launched in cold weather. Morton Thiokol's managers decided to launch the shuttle despite his warnings, leading to the catastrophic failure. He was considered a high-profile whistleblower.

Early life and education
Boisjoly was born on April 25, 1938, in the Boston suburb of Lowell, Massachusetts. He grew up  in the neighborhood of Belvedere as the son of a mill worker and one of three brothers. During high-school he played tennis.

Boisjoly studied mechanical engineering at the University of Massachusetts Lowell.

Career 
Boisjoly started his career at a used-aircraft company in western Massachusetts, before moving to California for work. He subsequently worked for companies in California on lunar module life-support systems and the moon vehicle. He later worked for Morton Thiokol, the manufacturer of the solid rocket boosters (SRBs) for the Space Shuttle program.

O-ring safety concerns

Boisjoly wrote a memo in July 1985 to his superiors concerning the faulty design of the solid rocket boosters that, if left unaddressed, could lead to a catastrophic event during launch of a Space Shuttle. Such a catastrophic event occurred six months later resulting in the Space Shuttle Challenger disaster.

This memo followed his investigation of a solid rocket booster (SRB) from a shuttle flight in January 1985. During his investigation, he discovered that the first of a system of two O-rings had failed completely and that damage had been caused to the second O-ring.

The O-rings were two rubber rings that formed a seal between two sections of the SRBs. The sections of the boosters were joined using tang and clevis joints and the rings were intended to seal the joint while allowing for the inevitable movement between the sections under flight conditions. By design, pressure from within the booster was to push a fillet of putty into the joint, forcing the O-ring into its seat. The system never functioned as designed. The rings were supposed to sit in a groove and seal the joint between the sections of the booster. It was found, however, that flight dynamics caused the joints in the SRBs to flex during launch, opening a gap through which rocket exhaust could escape. As the joints flexed, the rings would come out of their grooves and move to a new position in the joint, a process called extrusion. The extruded ring would form a seal in this new position, but during the time it took for the ring to shift, the joint was unsealed and hot gases could escape, a process called blow-by. These hot gases damaged the rings until the seal was achieved.

Boisjoly's investigation showed that the amount of damage to the O-ring depended on the length of time it took for the ring to move out of its groove and make the seal, and that the amount of time depended on the temperature of the rings. Cold weather made the rubber hard and less flexible, meaning that extrusion took more time and more blow-by took place. He determined that if the O-rings were damaged enough they could fail.

If the second O-ring had failed, the results would almost certainly have been catastrophic with an almost instantaneous explosion of gargantuan proportions, resulting in the complete loss of the shuttle, the crew and the launch pad facilities seemingly the only outcome. His investigation found that the first O-ring failed because the low temperatures on the night before the flight had compromised the flexibility of the O-ring, reducing its ability to form a seal. The temperature at launch had been only  , the coldest on record (until January 28, 1986). The first rubber O-ring had formed a partial seal, not a complete one; but the second O-ring had held.

Boisjoly sent a memo describing the problem to his managers, but was apparently ignored.
Following several further memos, a task force was convened to investigate the matter, but after a month Boisjoly realized that the task force had no power, no resources, and no management support. In late 1985, Boisjoly advised his managers that if the problem was not fixed, there was a distinct chance that a shuttle mission would end in disaster. No action was taken.

Challenger disaster

Following the announcement that the Challenger mission was confirmed for January 28, 1986, Boisjoly and his colleagues tried to stop the flight. Temperatures were due to fall to  overnight. Boisjoly felt that this would severely compromise the safety of the O-ring and potentially the flight.

The matter was discussed with Morton Thiokol managers, who agreed that the issue was serious enough to recommend delaying the flight. NASA protocols required all shuttle sub-contractors to sign off on each flight. During the go/no-go telephone conference with NASA management the night before the launch, Morton Thiokol notified NASA of their recommendation to postpone. NASA officials strongly questioned the recommendations, and asked (some say pressured) Morton Thiokol to reverse its decision.

The Morton Thiokol managers asked for a few minutes off the phone to discuss their final position again. The management team held a meeting from which the engineering team, including Boisjoly and others, were deliberately excluded. The Morton Thiokol managers advised NASA that their data was inconclusive. NASA asked if there were objections. Hearing none, NASA decided to launch the STS-51-L Challenger mission.

Historians have noted that this was the first time NASA had ever launched a mission after having received an explicit no-go recommendation from a major contractor, and that questioning the recommendation and asking for a reconsideration was highly unusual. Many have also noted that the sharp questioning of the no-go recommendation stands out in contrast to the immediate and unquestioning acceptance when the recommendation was changed to a go.

The concerns of Boisjoly proved correct. Initially, Boisjoly was relieved when the flight lifted off, as he had predicted that the SRB would explode before lift-off.

Upon ignition, the O-ring was burned to ash, which formed a weak seal in the joint. At 58 seconds after launch, the shuttle was buffeted by high-altitude winds, the ash seal collapsed, and hot gases streamed out of the joint in a visible blowtorch-like plume that burned into the external hydrogen tank. At about 73 seconds, the adjacent SRB strut gave way, the right rocket booster crashed into the external fuel tank and the vehicle quickly disintegrated.

Later career
After President Ronald Reagan ordered a presidential commission to review the disaster, Boisjoly was one of the witnesses called. He gave accounts of how and why he felt the O-rings had failed, and argued that the caucus called by Morton Thiokol managers, which resulted in a recommendation to launch, was an "unethical decision-making forum resulting from intense customer intimidation." Isolated from his colleagues who were redesigning the O-ring, his self-esteem suffered and he lost his confidence as an engineer. Boisjoly, who understood the potential consequences of an unsafe launch, had acted on his conscience in trying to prevent it. But Thiokol executives didn’t respect him as a valued professional. Six months after the disaster, Boisjoly requested an extended sick leave. He never worked as an engineer again.    
After leaving Morton Thiokol, Boisjoly founded a forensic engineering firm and was frequently invited to speak on leadership ethics.

Personal life 
For his honesty and integrity both leading up to and directly following the shuttle disaster, Boisjoly received the Award for Scientific Freedom and Responsibility from the American Association for the Advancement of Science in 1988.

When Boisjoly left Morton Thiokol, he took 14 boxes containing every note and paper he received or sent in seven years. On May 13, 2010, he donated his personal memoranda—six boxes of personal papers, including memos and notes from his congressional testimony—to Chapman University in Orange, California. Rand Boyd, the special-collections and archival librarian at Chapman's Leatherby Libraries, said the materials will be catalogued and archived. They can now be viewed by library visitors.

Boisjoly married his wife Roberta in 1963. The couple had two daughters and at the time of his death eight grandchildren. Boisjoly died of cancer of the colon, kidneys, and liver on January 6, 2012, in Nephi, Utah.

Depiction in media
In the 1990 made-for-television film Challenger, Boisjoly was portrayed by actor Peter Boyle.

References

External links
Boisjoly, Roger (May 15, 2006) "Ethical Decisions - Morton Thiokol and the Space Shuttle Challenger Disaster - Index" Online Ethics Center for Engineering, National Academy of Engineering
Roger and Roberta Boisjoly NASA Challenger disaster collection  at Chapman University Leatherby Libraries
History of the Challenger accident from the NASA Marshall Spaceflight Center, discussing the O-ring and Boisjoly's objections to flight
Robison, Wade, Boisjoly, David Hoeker and Stefan Young, "Representation and Misrepresentation: Tufte and the Morton Thiokol Engineers on the Challenger"  (Science and Engineering Ethics (2002) 8, 59–81) sharply criticizes Edward Tufte's analysis of pre-disaster non-employment of graphics in Tufte's Visual Explanations. Robison was a Rochester Institute of Technology professor; Hoeker and Young freshman RIT students. Alternative link.

American aerospace engineers
American mechanical engineers
American whistleblowers
Deaths from cancer in Utah
People from Lowell, Massachusetts
People from St. George, Utah
Space Shuttle Challenger disaster
University of Massachusetts Lowell alumni
1938 births
2012 deaths
People from Nephi, Utah